Elim, also known as the Dr. William Keil House, is a historic home located near Bethel, Shelby County, Missouri.  It was built in the late-1840s, and is a -story, brick and stone dwelling over a full basement.  It has a simple ridge roof and two porches.  It was built by the members of the Society of Bethel and served as the residence of the society's founder Dr. William Keil (1812-1877).

It was listed on the National Register of Historic Places in 1971.

See also
Hebron

References

Houses on the National Register of Historic Places in Missouri
Houses completed in 1845
Buildings and structures in Shelby County, Missouri
National Register of Historic Places in Shelby County, Missouri